Edwin Stevens may refer to:
 Edwin Stevens (missionary) (1802–1837), American protestant missionary in China
 Edwin Stevens (actor), 1860-1923), American stage and film actor
 Arthur Edwin Stevens (1905–1995), Welsh inventor who designed the world's first wearable electronic hearing aid
 Edwin A. Stevens (1794–1868), American inventor and entrepreneur
 Edwin A. Stevens Jr. (1858–1918), American soldier, engineer and architect

See also
 Edwin A. Stevens Hall (built in 1870) in USA
 Edwin S. Lines (1845–1927), American clergyman, bishop of Newark